The AN/FPS-18 was a medium-range search Radar used by the United States Air Force Air Defense Command.

This medium-range search radar was designed and built by Bendix as a SAGE system gap-filler radar to provide low-altitude coverage. Operating in the S-band at a frequency between 2700 and 2900 MHz, the AN/FPS-18 could detect at a range of 65 miles.

The system was deployed in the late 1950s and 1960s at unmanned radar facilities (called "Gap Fillers") designed to fill the low-altitude gaps between manned long-range radar stations.   Gaps in coverage existed due to the curvature of the earth, mountains, hills, valleys, rivers, and so forth.

The typical unmanned gap-filler radar annex consisted of a small L-shaped cinder-block building, with the radar equipment and the data-transmission equipment in one  section and one or more diesel generators in the other section.  These unmanned gap-filler sites  generally had a three-legged radar tower about 85 feet tall where the AN/FPS-18 Radar was mounted inside a radome.

References

 AN/FPS-18 @ radomes.org
 Winkler, David F. (1997), Searching the skies: the legacy of the United States Cold War defense radar program. Prepared for United States Air Force Headquarters Air Combat Command.

Ground radars
Military radars of the United States
Radars of the United States Air Force
Military equipment introduced in the 1950s